The Garissa Museum is a museum located in Kenya.

References

See also 
 List of museums in Kenya

Museums in Kenya